CIAA may refer to:

 Cayman Islands Athletic Association, the governing body for the sport of athletics in the Cayman Islands
 Central Intercollegiate Athletic Association, an NCAA Division II collegiate athletic conference
 Confederation of the Food and Drink Industries of the EU, a European trade organization
 Confederation of Indian Amateur Astronomer Association
 Conference on Implementation and Application of Automata, an international academic conference in computer science
 Cook Inlet Aquaculture Association, a non-profit organization promoting sustainable salmon fishing in Alaska
 Office of the Coordinator of Inter-American Affairs, the U.S. government office led by the Coordinator of Inter-American Affairs
 Comisión Investigadora de Accidentes de Aviación, Dominican Republic aviation accident investigation authority
 Commission for the Investigation of Abuse of Authority, an apex constitutional body for corruption control for the Government of Nepal